The 2016 FIBA U18 European Championship Division C was the 12th edition of the Division C of FIBA U18 European Championship. The competition took place in Serravalle, San Marino, from 8 to 15 July 2016.

Azerbaijan won its first ever gold in this event by beating Andorra in the final, 74–57.

Participating teams

First round
In this round, the 9 teams are allocated in two groups with four teams in Group A and five teams in Group B.

All times are local (UTC+2).

Group A

Group B

Classification group for 5th–9th place

Final round

Semifinals

Third place game

Final

Final standings

References

External links
FIBA official website

FIBA U18 European Championship Division C
C
2016–17 in European basketball
2016 in San Marino
International basketball competitions hosted by San Marino
July 2016 sports events in Europe